Progress 36 was a Soviet uncrewed Progress cargo spacecraft, which was launched in May 1988 to resupply the Mir space station.

Launch
Progress 36 launched on 13 May 1988 from the Baikonur Cosmodrome in the Kazakh SSR. It used a Soyuz-U2 rocket.

Docking
Progress 36 docked with the aft port of the Kvant-1 module of Mir on 15 May 1988 at 02:13:26 UTC, and was undocked on 5 June 1988 at 11:11:55 UTC.

Decay
It remained in orbit until 5 June 1988, when it was deorbited. The deorbit burn occurred at 20:28:00 UTC and the mission ended at 21:18:40 UTC.

See also

 1988 in spaceflight
 List of Progress missions
 List of uncrewed spaceflights to Mir

References

Progress (spacecraft) missions
1988 in the Soviet Union
Spacecraft launched in 1988
Spacecraft which reentered in 1988
Spacecraft launched by Soyuz-U rockets